St. Louis Lambert Airport Police Department  is responsible for all law enforcement and criminal investigations within St. Louis Lambert International Airport. The Airport Police is responsible for traffic control, criminal investigations, airport community oriented policing, airport security, rapid response counter terrorism, enforcement of local, state and federal laws at the airport and providing canine explosive detection support to the airport and surrounding communities.

The Airport Police Department is a division of the City of St. Louis Airport Commission.

Merging the Airport Police Department with the police department of the city of St. Louis has been discussed.

Canine Unit

The Canine Unit is staffed by police officers who handle 10 canines. The canines are available on a 24-hour basis to assist with seeking hidden explosives and narcotics.

References

Airport police departments of the United States
Specialist police departments of Missouri
Police
Government of St. Louis